Monivong Boulevard is a central boulevard and thoroughfare of Phnom Penh, the capital of Cambodia. 

It was named after King Monivong of Cambodia. Most streets in Phnom Penh have numbers rather than names and Monivong Boulevard is also known as Street 93. It crosses Sihanouk Boulevard near the centre of the city.

Route
Monivong Boulevard crosses the city from north to south.

The other main north south thoroughfare in the center of town is Norodom Boulevard. For most of its length, Monivong Boulevard runs parallel to Norodom Boulevard at a distance of 800 metres. However, the two major boulevards eventually join at the traffic circle near the Monivong Bridge over the Bassac River in the southern section of the city. 

The Phnom Penh Hotel and Phnom Penh Commercial Bank are located on the boulevard.

Gallery

References

Roads in Cambodia
Transport in Phnom Penh
Boulevards